Francois Etoundi (born  in Yaounde) is a Cameroonian born Australian male weightlifter, competing in the 77 kg category and representing Australia at international competitions. He competed at world championships, most recently at the 2009 World Weightlifting Championships.

He competed in the men's 77 kg event at the 2014 Commonwealth Games where he won a bronze medal. The following day, he was arrested for breaking the nose of fellow Welsh competitor Gareth Evans and ordered to pay £400 after appearing at Glasgow Sheriff Court. He was later stripped of his Commonwealth Games accreditation and sent home in disgrace.

On the 14th of April 2021, he was banned from competing for a three-year period by Sport Integrity Australia for failing to submit to sample collection.

Major results

Medalbox note

References

External links

1984 births
Living people
Australian male weightlifters
People from Yaoundé
Commonwealth Games bronze medallists for Australia
Commonwealth Games medallists in weightlifting
Weightlifters at the 2006 Commonwealth Games
Weightlifters at the 2010 Commonwealth Games
Weightlifters at the 2014 Commonwealth Games
Weightlifters at the 2018 Commonwealth Games
Cameroonian emigrants to Australia
Medallists at the 2014 Commonwealth Games
Medallists at the 2018 Commonwealth Games